The 2011–12 NCAA Division I men's ice hockey season began on October 1, 2011 and concluded with the 2012 NCAA Division I men's ice hockey tournament's championship game on April 7, 2012 at the Tampa Bay Times Forum in Tampa, Florida. This was the 65th season in which an NCAA ice hockey championship was held and is the 118th year overall where an NCAA school fielded a team.

Pre-season polls

The top 20 from USCHO.com/CBS College Sports, September 26, 2011, and the top 15 from USA Today/USA Hockey Magazine, September 26, 2011. First place votes are in parentheses.

Regular season

Standings

2012 NCAA tournament

Note: * denotes overtime period(s)

Player stats

Scoring leaders

  
GP = Games played; G = Goals; A = Assists; Pts = Points; PIM = Penalty minutes

Leading goaltenders

GP = Games played; Min = Minutes played; W = Wins; L = Losses; T = Ties; GA = Goals against; SO = Shutouts; SV% = Save percentage; GAA = Goals against average

Awards

NCAA

Atlantic Hockey

CCHA

ECAC

Hockey East

WCHA

See also
 2011–12 NCAA Division II men's ice hockey season
 2011–12 NCAA Division III men's ice hockey season
 2011–12 NCAA Division I women's ice hockey season

References

External links
USCHO.com 

 
NCAA